KVZ or kvz may refer to:
 KVZ S.C., a sports club in Tanzania and Zanzibar
 Kavali railway station's rail station code
 Tsaukambo language's ISO 639 language code
 , a publication of the Communist League of West Germany
 Z-Aero Airlines' ICAO airline code

See also

KV-2, a tank
KV2, a tomb
KVS (disambiguation)